Thomas Tobias Seidelin (born 1 April 1987 ) is a Danish professional footballer, who currently plays for Danish 2nd Division East side BK Søllerød-Vedbæk.

Notes

1987 births
Living people
Danish men's footballers
Lyngby Boldklub players
Boldklubben Frem players
Danish Superliga players
Association football goalkeepers
Seidelin family